Fort Boise Lake Wildlife Management Area at  is an Idaho wildlife management area in Canyon County near Parma. It was established in 1956 when  were deeded to the Idaho Department of Fish and Game by Idaho Power Company.

The WMA's wetlands are within the Boise and Snake rivers' floodplains and were originally used to replace goose nesting islands on the Snake River flooded by the Brownlee Dam. The shallow water and thick vegetation attract waterfowl and wildlife watchers and hunters.

References

Protected areas established in 1956
Protected areas of Canyon County, Idaho
Wildlife management areas of Idaho
Idaho Power
1956 establishments in Idaho